The Treaty of Washington City was a treaty signed on January 20, 1825 (proclaimed on February 19, 1825) between the Choctaw (an American Indian tribe) and the United States Government.

Overview
Apuckshunubbee, Pushmataha, and Mosholatubbee, the principal leaders of the Choctaws, went to Washington City (the 19th century name for Washington, D.C.) to discuss encroaching settlement and to seek the expulsion of settlers or financial compensation. The group also included Talking Warrior, Red Fort, Nittahkachee, Col. Robert Cole and David Folsom, both half-breed Indians, Captain Daniel McCurtain, and Major John Pitchlynn, the U.S. Interpreter.

The proposed route to Washington was to travel the Natchez Trace to Nashville, Tennessee, then to Lexington, Kentucky, onward to Maysville, Kentucky, across the Ohio River northward to Chillicothe, Ohio, (former principal town of the Shawnee), then finally east over the "National Highway" to Washington City.

Meetings while in Washington City

Pushmataha met with President James Monroe and gave a speech to Secretary of War John C. Calhoun, reminding him of the longstanding alliances between the United States and the Choctaws. He said, "[I] can say and tell the truth that no Choctaw ever drew his bow against the United States ... My nation has given of their country until it is very small. We are in trouble."."

While in Washington, Pushmataha sat for a portrait by Charles Bird King in his Army uniform; it hung in the Smithsonian Institution until 1865.

Pushmataha also met with the Marquis de Lafayette, who was visiting Washington City. Pushmataha said, "Nearly fifty snows have melted since you drew your sword with Washington and fought the enemies of the United States ... Our hearts have longed to see you."

Terms

The preamble begins with,

The treaty had the following abbreviated terms,

1. Lands ceded to the United States. 
2. $6,000 to be paid to Choctaws annually, forever. 
3. $6,000 to be paid them annually for 16 years. 
4. Provision for Choctaws who may desire to remain. 
5. A certain debt due by Choctaws relinquished. 
6. Payment for services rendered in the Pensacola campaign. 
7. Fourth article of the aforesaid treaty to be modified. The Congress of the United States shall not exercise the power of apportioning the lands ... and of bringing them under the laws of the United States, but with the consent of the Choctaw Nation.
8. Payment to satisfy claims due by United States. 
9. An agent and blacksmith for Choctaws west of the Mississippi. 
10. Robert Cole to receive a medal. 
11. Friendship perpetuated. 
12. When to take effect.

Signatories

J. C. Calhoun, Mooshulatubbee, Robert Cole, Daniel McCurtain, Talking Warrior, Red Fort, Nittuckachee, David Folsom, J. L. McDonald, Thos. L. McKenney, Hezekiah Miller, and John Pitchlynn ( United States interpreter).

Aftermath

Apuckshunubbee died in Maysville, Kentucky; and Pushmataha died in Washington. Apuckshunubbee was reported to have died from a broken neck caused by a fall from a hotel balcony. Other historians say he fell from a cliff.

Pushmataha died of croup, even though the disease usually only afflicts infants and young children.

Apuckshunubee's successor was Robert Cole and later Greenwood LeFlore. Pushmataha's successor was Nittakechi. The deaths of these two leaders effectively crippled the Choctaw Nation. Within six years the Choctaw were forced to cede their last remaining territory in Mississippi to the United States.

See also

 List of Choctaw Treaties
Treaty of Hopewell
Treaty of Fort Adams
Treaty of Fort Confederation
Treaty of Hoe Buckintoopa
Treaty of Mount Dexter
Treaty of Fort St. Stephens
Treaty of Doak's Stand
Treaty of Dancing Rabbit Creek
 List of treaties

Citations

External links
 Indian Affairs: Laws and Treaties (Treaty with the Choctaw, 1825)

Native American history of Arkansas
Washington
1825 treaties
1825 in Arkansas Territory
1825 in the United States